Domingo Rivero (March 23, 1852 - September 8, 1929) was a Spanish poet from the Canary Islands.

1852 births
1929 deaths
Spanish male poets